Language Question can refer to several linguistic and/or political debates, including:
 Greek language question
 
 Language Question (Malta)